Pseudocalotes kakhienensis, the Kakhyen Hills spiny lizard or Burmese mountain agamid, is a species of agamid lizard found in southern China (western Yunnan), Myanmar (= Burma) (east of Irrawaddy River), India, and northern Thailand.

The type locality is Ponsee, Western Yunnan.

References

 Anderson, JOHN 1879 Anatomical and Zoological Researches: Comprising an Account of the Zoological Results of the Two Expeditions to Western Yunnan in 1866 and 1875; and a Monograph of the Two Cetacean Genera Platanista and Orcella. Bernard Quaritch, London "1878". Two volumes (Text: 985 pages [herpetology: pages 703–860, 969-975]; Atlas: 85 plates [herpetological plates 55–78, 75A, 75B]).
 Boulenger, G.A. 1885 Catalogue of the Lizards in the British Museum (Nat. Hist.) I. Geckonidae, Eublepharidae, Uroplatidae, Pygopodidae, Agamidae. London: 450 pp.

Pseudocalotes
Reptiles of Myanmar
Reptiles of China
Reptiles of India
Reptiles of Thailand
Fauna of Yunnan
Taxa named by John Anderson (zoologist)
Reptiles described in 1879